is Ai Otsuka's third single. The title track was used in a television advertisement for Sato Healthcare's cold relief tablets .

Track list

Sales
Initial week estimate: 32,591
Total estimate: 105,609

References
avex online (2006), Ai Otsuka Official Web Site
Oricon Style (2006), Oricon Style Online

2004 singles
Ai Otsuka songs
Songs written by Ai Otsuka
2004 songs
Avex Trax singles